The Essential Conan is a collection of fantasy short stories written by Robert E. Howard featuring his sword and sorcery hero Conan the Barbarian.  The book was published in 1998 by  the Science Fiction Book Club.  It collects the editions of the Conan books, edited by Karl Edward Wagner and published by Berkley Books in 1977.  Most of the stories originally appeared in the magazines Weird Tales, The Phantagraph and The Howard Collector.  The Wagner editions were the first to virtually reproduce Howard's original stories without any editorial changes other than typo fixes.

Contents

 The Hour of the Dragon
 Foreword, by Karl Edward Wagner
 "The Hour of the Dragon" (poem)
 "The Hour of the Dragon"
 The People of the Black Circle
 Foreword, by Karl Edward Wagner
 "The Devil in Iron"
 "The People of the Black Circle"
 "A Witch Shall Be Born"
 "Jewels of Gwahlur"
 Afterword, by Karl Edward Wagner
 Red Nails
 Foreword, by Karl Edward Wagner
 "Beyond the Black River"
 "Shadows in Zamboula"
 "Red Nails"
 "The Hyborian Age" (essay)
 Afterword, by Karl Edward Wagner

References

1998 short story collections
Fantasy short story collections
Conan the Barbarian books
Berkley Books books